Cathedral of Hongtong is the cathedral of Hongtong County, in Shanxi, China.

History 
In 1932, the Holy See set up the Roman Catholic Diocese of Hongdong.

In 1958, Hongtong County was selected as one of the two pilot counties for the elimination of religion in China (the other is Pingyang County, Zhejiang). The Catholic Church was completely destroyed and the Cathedral was demolished. It was rebuilt in 2002 with a Gothic architecture style.

References

Further reading 
 
 

Roman Catholic cathedrals in China
2002 establishments in China
Churches completed in 2002
Gothic Revival church buildings in China
Roman Catholic churches in Shanxi